Llanada may refer to the following places:

La Llanada, municipality in the Nariño Department, Colombia